DRDOS may refer to:

 DR-DOS (originally DR DOS), a computer operating system developed by Digital Research, Novell, Caldera, and DeviceLogics
 DRDOS, Inc. also known as DeviceLogics, a (former) developer of DR-DOS
 Distributed reflective denial of service (DRDoS), a type of attempt to disrupt a computer network